San Rafael – El Placer is a resort in the Maldonado Department of southeastern Uruguay.

Geography
The resort is located on the coast of the Atlantic Ocean, on Route 10 and borders Punta del Este to the west and the resort La Barra to the east, across the mouth of the stream Arroyo Maldonado.

Population
In 2011 San Rafael – El Placer had a population of 3,146 permanent inhabitants and 2,302 dwellings.
 
Source: Instituto Nacional de Estadística de Uruguay

References

External links
INE map of Punta del Este and San Rafael–El Placer

Populated places in the Maldonado Department
Seaside resorts in Uruguay